Legacy of the Daleks is an original novel written by John Peel and based on the long-running British science fiction television series Doctor Who. It features the Eighth Doctor, Susan, the Master - as the Roger Delgado incarnation - and the Daleks.

Plot
As the Doctor prepares to search for Sam, he receives a psychic cry of pain and despair from his granddaughter Susan, and discovers that it was focused through another TARDIS on a distant planet. He decides to materialize on Earth following the Dalek invasion, the same time period in which Sam disappeared; perhaps in hope he can find her as well while preventing whatever caused Susan to send the cry.

Following the invasion, Earth is devastatingly underpopulated, and the survivors (in Britain, at least) have coalesced into city-states which are currently engaged in political infighting. Lord Haldoran supplies most of England with power, but Lord London opposes him and many city-states are flocking to London for power supplies. War seems inevitable, but Haldoran has a secret weapon; his mysterious military advisor, Estro, is supplying him with Dalek guns. Meanwhile, Susan and her husband David are having marital difficulties, as it has become increasingly difficult as the decades pass to hide the fact that Susan isn’t aging while David is. Susan is a Peace Officer, one of the elite who keep the Earth safe from the Dalek Artefacts left behind after the invaders were defeated; when she receives word that someone is tampering with the buried DA-17, she sets off to investigate, but is captured by Estro’s men.

The Doctor materializes on Earth and meets Donna, a knight of Domain London and Lord London’s daughter. He accompanies her back to London, where he learns of the political situation and is disappointed to find that the people of Earth are fighting amongst themselves rather than working together to rebuild the planet. Haldoran launches an attack on London, sending his best man, Tomlin; in a lure to draw London’s troops out into the open, while Haldoran’s officers Barlow and Craddock strike with their Dalek weapons. Tomlin learns of their betrayal, and escapes the battle, vowing revenge.

The Doctor and Donna meet David and learn of Susan’s disappearance, and they set off for DA-17 to investigate themselves. They too are captured, and sent to Haldoran’s castle for questioning; Donna is terrified, as she was once married to Haldoran for political reasons and knows the man to be cruel and sadistic. The Doctor is more concerned with the fact that people are tampering with a Dalek Artefact, as the Daleks always leave behind traps for the unwary. At Haldoran’s castle, they meet Estro, whom the Doctor instantly recognizes as the Master in a former incarnation, the one the Third Doctor fought most often, and the Doctor realizes that, by backtracking Susan’s call, he has broken a law of time and encountered the Master “out of order”. The Master reveals that he has set Haldoran and London against each other to amuse himself while he waits for DA-17 to be opened. Haldoran believes that the Master is getting his Dalek weapons from DA-17, but in fact he is supplying Haldoran from a private cache of his own and intends to open DA-17, since he has learnt of a powerful secret weapon inside which he intends to seize.

Susan manages to escape from her guards and break into the mine workings around DA-17, but is too late to stop the technicians from completing their work. By supplying DA-17 with power the Master was hoping to decode the security locks keeping the Artefact sealed, but in fact he has supplied it with enough power to begin manufacturing new Daleks from its store of raw minerals and Dalek embryos. The Daleks emerge, capture Susan and transform the Master’s guards and technicians into Robomen. Susan is left alive for questioning, but manages to escape from her Roboman guards and get to the heart of the Dalek Artefact. There, the Master materializes in his TARDIS and reveals that the Daleks have created a matter transmuter capable of transforming any element into any other element; he intends to use it as a weapon, holding civilisations hostage to his demands for power.

The Doctor, David and Donna overpower their guards and try to get past Haldoran to destroy his cache of Dalek weapons, but Haldoran sees through them and recaptures them. At that moment Tomlin arrives and tries to kill him, and although Haldoran kills Tomlin, Donna takes advantage of the distraction and shoots Haldoran as well. Barlow returns, having successfully conquered London with his Dalek guns; Lord London’s men killed him when he refused to surrender. The Doctor, learning that all communication has been lost with the Master’s men at DA-17, manages to convince Barlow that something has gone wrong there, where Barlow leads a squad to the pit and learns what has happened. The Daleks are currently confined to the pit area, but are building a power transmitter which will enable them to venture further into the surrounding countryside.

Barlow and his men fight the Daleks and Robomen, while the Doctor, David and Donna break into DA-17 to find out what is really going on. Since the Daleks are no longer receiving power from Haldoran’s stores, the Doctor increases the embryo production in the hatchery, draining power from the Artefact’s reserves; and while the Daleks are busy dealing with this, he also sets the factory production reactors to overload. Meanwhile, the Master seizes the core of the matter transmuter and tries to escape; the Doctor, Donna and David run into him, and when the Master tries to shoot the Doctor, David pushes the Doctor aside and is killed himself.

The Master retreats back to his TARDIS and leaves with Susan as his hostage, and the Doctor and Donna escape from DA-17 moments before its reactors overload and explode, wiping out the Daleks. The Doctor slowly recovers from his injuries, and Donna and Barlow decide to marry; partly for political convenience, but not entirely. Once the Doctor has fully recovered he returns to the TARDIS and tracks the flight of the Master’s, but when he discovers that it materialized briefly on Tersurus and then left again, he recalls the name of the planet and realizes what happened. The Master, not realizing that his hostage was also Gallifreyan, was caught off guard when Susan amplified a shriek of pain and despair through his own TARDIS’ telepathic circuits, incapacitating him; he tried to flee out onto the surface of Tersurus, but was caught in the explosion and nearly killed when Susan turned his own TCE on the matter transmuter. Susan then left Tersurus in the Master’s TARDIS, and the crippled Master remained to be discovered by Chancellor Goth of Gallifrey who was investigating the renegade TARDIS materialization. The Doctor decides to leave Susan her freedom, and sets off once again in search of Sam.

Continuity
This story provides a major reason for why the Master had regenerated into his final form when the Fourth Doctor met him in The Deadly Assassin. The reason provided in this novel is that the Master stole a Dalek Superweapon, and with Susan in tow, took his TARDIS to Terserus. However, Susan used the telepathic circuits to overpower the Master, and kicked him out of his TARDIS. He was still clutching the superweapon when Susan shot it with the Tissue Compression Eliminator, causing it to explode. Susan took his TARDIS, and the Master regenerated. Chancellor Goth detected the TARDIS leaving the planet, and found the Master there. From there, the events of The Deadly Assassin take place.
For Susan, this story is set thirty years after  The Dalek Invasion of Earth.
For the Master, this story is set after Frontier in Space.
The Doctor recalls seeing Susan as part of 'Rassilon's Game', in The Five Doctors.
The factory within the Dalek Artefact bears a strong resemblance to the Dalek factory in  The Power of the Daleks.
There is a passing reference to the television film about the Doctor and hospitals (and people trying to kill him in them).

Outside references 
Susan calls the Master a "troll".

References

External links
The Cloister Library - Legacy of the Daleks

1998 British novels
1998 science fiction novels
Eighth Doctor Adventures
Dalek novels
British science fiction novels
Novels by John Peel
Legacy